Charles Gerald John Cadogan, 8th Earl Cadogan,  (born 24 March 1937), styled as Viscount Chelsea until 1997, is a British billionaire peer and landowner. He is a first cousin of the Aga Khan IV, spiritual head of the Ismaili sect of Shia Muslims.

Biography

Early life
He was born the son of William Gerald Charles Cadogan, 7th Earl Cadogan and Primrose Lilian Yarde-Buller, and was known as Viscount Chelsea before inheriting the title of Earl Cadogan on the death of his father on 4 July 1997. He was educated at Ludgrove School and Eton College.

Career
He was a Second Lieutenant in the Coldstream Guards. He was appointed a Deputy Lieutenant (DL) of Greater London in 1996. He chaired Chelsea Football Club from 1981 until 1982 and is also a Governor of Culford School in Suffolk. He owned Bedfordshire-based high-end upholstered furniture manufacturer, Peter Guild Ltd, (now based in Long Eaton) for a period during the 1990s.

In the Sunday Times Rich List 2009 ranking of the wealthiest people in the United Kingdom, his family was placed 14th with an estimated fortune of £2 billion. He is the second richest UK-based peer behind the Duke of Westminster. The Cadogan family's wealth is based on Cadogan Estates, which administers extensive landholdings in Chelsea, a wealthy part of London, including much of Sloane Street and Cadogan Hall.

As of July 2021, he is worth over $6 billion according to Bloomberg.

Honours
 Salvation Army Cross of the Order of Distinguished Auxiliary Service - 1970 (for exceptional service rendered to the Army by non-Salvationists)
 Knight Commander of the Order of the British Empire (KBE) - 2012 Queen's Birthday Honours (for charitable services)

Marriages and children
On 6 June 1963, he married Lady Philippa Wallop (1937-1984), daughter of Gerard Wallop, 9th Earl of Portsmouth, and had two sons and one daughter:
 Lady Anna-Karina Cadogan (b. 4 Feb 1964)
 Edward Charles Cadogan, Viscount Chelsea (b. 10 May 1966)
 William John Cadogan (b. 9 Nov 1973)

He married secondly the etiquette expert Jennifer Rae (married 1989, divorced 1994).

His third marriage is to Dorothy Ann Shipsey (married 1994), formerly the matron at King Edward VII Hospital for Officers.

Lord Cadogan's heir, Viscount Chelsea, lives at the family's Snaigow estate in Scotland. Lord Chelsea was educated at St David's College, Llandudno, and then served with the RAF in the first Gulf war.

See also
 Cadogan Square

References

Sources

External links

 Cadogan Estates

1937 births
Living people
Cadogan, Charles Gerald John, 8th Earl
Cadogan, Charles Gerald John, 8th Earl
Cadogan, Charles Gerald John, 8th Earl
Deputy Lieutenants of Greater London
Cadogan, Charles Gerald John, 8th Earl
Knights Commander of the Order of the British Empire
People educated at Eton College
English billionaires
Cadogan family
Coldstream Guards officers
People educated at Ludgrove School
Cadogan